Laniarius is a genus of brightly coloured, carnivorous passerine birds commonly known as boubous or gonoleks. Not to be confused with the similar-sounding genus Lanius, they were formerly classed with the true shrikes in the family Laniidae, but they and related genera are now considered sufficiently distinctive to be separated from that group as the bush-shrike family Malaconotidae.

This is an African group of species which are found in scrub or open woodland. They are similar in habits to shrikes, hunting insects and other small prey from a perch on a bush. Although similar in build to the shrikes, these tend to be either colourful species or largely black. Some species are also quite secretive.

Taxonomy and systematics
The genus Laniarius was introduced by the French ornithologist Louis Jean Pierre Vieillot in 1816 with the yellow-crowned gonolek as the type species.

The closest relatives of the genus appear to be the genus Chlorophoneus. Previously, members of the genus Laniarius had been classified on the basis of plumage. However, a 2008 molecular study found that the species had developed different colours and patterns in plumage independently and similar-coloured species were often unrelated. The authors hypothesized that the ancestor of the genus may have been dark-coloured.

There are 22 recognised species:

Formerly, some authorities also considered the following species (or subspecies) as species within the genus Laniarius:
 Rufous whistler (as Laniarius rubrigaster)

References

 
Bird genera